Leprecan is a protein associated with osteogenesis imperfecta type VIII. 

Leprecan is part of a superfamily of 2OG-Fe(II) dioxygenase, along with DNA repair protein AlkB, and disease resistant EGL-9. The enzyme was found to be a type of hydroxylases used in the substrate formation of protein glycosylation.

Activities 
Leprecan, a proteoglycan, has demonstrated prolyl hydroxylase activity; prolyl hydroxylases hydroxylate proline residues. Prolyl 3-hydroxylase 1, P3H1, forms a larger complex with CRTAP and cyclophilin B, CyPB, in the endoplasimic reticulum. The complex hydroxylates a single proline residue, Pro986, on collagen chains. Recessive forms of Osteogenesis Imperfecta are partly caused by a mutation in the LEPRE1 gene that encodes prolyl 3-hydroxylase 1; malfunctioning prolyl 3-hydroxylase in leprecan leads to inappropriate collagen folding due to instability caused by the absence of hydroxyproline, the product of hydroxylating a proline residue.

References

External links